Heinrich Adolf von Bardeleben (1 March 1819 – 24 September 1895) was a German surgeon born in Frankfurt (Oder).

He studied medicine at the Universities of Heidelberg, Giessen, Paris and Berlin, receiving his doctorate in 1841 with a thesis on the construction of ductless glands. In 1848 he became an associate professor at Giessen followed by an appointment as a full professor of surgery at the University of Greifswald (1849). In 1868 he returned to Berlin, where he worked at the Charité until his death on 24 September 1895. he was rector of the University of Berlin in 1876–1877.

Known for his innovations associated with new surgical procedures, he is credited as being one of the first to introduce Joseph Lister's methodology for antiseptic treatment of wounds to the European continent. During the Austro-Prussian War (1866) and the Franco-Prussian War (1870-71) he served as Generalarzt to the army.

His daughter, Mite Kremnitz (born Marie von Bardeleben), was a noted German author.

Written works
 , 1841
  ("Surgery manual. Particularly for the needs of students"), 1852-1882
  ("About the conservative direction of the new surgery"), 1855
  ("Review of the progress of surgery in the second half of this century"), 1876
  ("About the meaning of scientific studies for the formation of physicians"), 1876
  ("Speech regarding the commemoration of the Friedrich-Wilhelm University of Berlin"), 1877
  ("About the theory of wounds and the newer methods of wound treatment"), 1878
  ("About the significance of military surgery in regards to the new bullets"), 1892

References 
 List of published works copied from an equivalent article at the German Wikipedia.

1819 births
1895 deaths
People from Frankfurt (Oder)
People from the Province of Brandenburg
German surgeons
German military personnel of the Franco-Prussian War
Academic staff of the University of Greifswald
Presidents of the Humboldt University of Berlin
Prussian generals
German military doctors
Prussian people of the Austro-Prussian War
19th-century Prussian military personnel
19th-century German physicians
Physicians of the Charité
Military personnel from Brandenburg